The Roger Clemens Award was an award that honored the top NCAA Division I college baseball pitcher of the year. The award was created prior to the 2004 season and succeeded the Rotary Smith Award.

"Roger Clemens has become synonymous with excellence in pitching at the professional level, as evidenced by his six Cy Young Awards. In addition to being a fabulous baseball player at every level in which he has participated, his passion for excellence is unsurpassed. He is mindful of giving back to a sport and a community he loves. With his college and professional resume, his name is most worthy and deserving in recognition of the most outstanding college pitcher. The Roger Clemens Award most certainly will become the college equivalent of the Cy Young, therefore becoming one of the most coveted in college baseball." CBPY Board Member Ray Mitchell (February 14, 2004)

Roger Clemens was an extremely successful college player with the Texas Longhorns before starting his scandal-riddled professional career.

The winner was determined by a vote of all Division I head coaches, selected members of the media, all past winners of the Roger Clemens Award, and all past winners of the Rotary Smith Award. The award was discontinued following the 2008 college baseball season.

Since 2009, the National Pitcher of the Year Award, presented by the College Baseball Foundation, now honors the top NCAA Division I college baseball pitcher of the year.

Winners

See also

List of college baseball awards

References

College baseball trophies and awards in the United States
College baseball player of the year awards in the United States
Awards established in 2004
Awards disestablished in 2008